Queen Wongyeong (원경왕후 민씨; 29 July 1365 – 18 August 1420) of the Yeoheung Min clan, was the primary wife of Taejong of Joseon, and the mother of Sejong the Great.

She was queen consort of Joseon from 1400, and was honored as Queen Jeong (정비) until her husband became King Emeritus of Joseon in 1418 after which she was honoured as Queen Dowager Hudeok (후덕왕대비).

Biography

Early life 
Lady Min was born on 29 July 1365, during King Gongmin of Goryeo’s 14th year of reign, as the third daughter and child within eight siblings, of Min Je from the Yeoheung Min clan and his first wife, Lady Song of the Yeosan Song clan. Her hometown was Kaegyeong or Songgyeong, Cheoldong (modern-day Kaeseong, North Korea). 

Through her grandfather, Lady Min eventually became the 12th great-grandfather to Queen Inhyeon, 16th great-grandfather to Princess Consort Min (Heungseon Daewongun’s mother), the 17th great-grandfather to Grand Internal Princess Consort Sunmok (Heungseon Daewongun’s wife) and Empress Myeongseong, and the 18th great-grandfather to Empress Sunmyeong. 

She is also a first cousin once removed to Royal Noble Consort Hui-bi of the Paepyeong Yun clan, a Consort of King Chunghye of Goryeo.

Through her great-grandfather, Lady Min is a first cousin thrice removed of Royal Noble Consort Myeong, the consort of her husband, King Taejong, and a first cousin four times removed of Crown Princess Consort Hwi, the consort of her grandson, King Munjong.

She was later arranged to marry the fifth son of Yi Seong-gye and his first wife Lady Han of the Anbyeon Han clan, Yi Bang-won of the Jeonju Yi clan, in 1382 at the age of 17. Ten years later when the Joseon Dynasty was established in 1392 by her father-in-law, her husband was then given the royal title of Prince Jeongan; making her Princess Jeongnyeong (정녕옹주, 靖寧翁主) at the age of 27. 

Because she was the wife of a prince, her mother was given the royal title of "Princess Consort Samhanguk" (Hangul: 삼한국대부인, Hanja: 三韓國大夫人), but was later given a alternative title, Internal Princess Consort Sunheung. Her father was given the royal title of "Internal Prince Yeoheung, Min Je" (Hangul: 여흥부원군 민제, Hanja: 驪興府院君 閔霽).

Involvement in royal politics 

In 1394, the capital was established from Kaegyeong (modern-day Kaesong) to Hanseong (modern-day Seoul). When the new dynasty was promulgated and officially brought into existence, Taejo brought up the issue of which son would be his successor. Although Taejo's fifth son by Queen Sinui, Yi Bang-won, had contributed most to assisting his father's rise to power, he harbored a profound hatred against two of his father's key allies in the court, the prime minister Jeong Do-jeon and Nam Eun.

In 1398, Jeong Do-jeon, who was enjoying great power at the time, enforced the Enforcement Breakdown Act and returned all the private soldiers and weapons to the state, but Lady Min had hid the weapons and private soldiers, that belonged to her family, in her house. Shortly after Taejo fell ill, the Min clan took advantage of this opportunity to give the weaponry and resources to Yi Bang-won to which Lady Min tried to encourage his coup.

Yi Bang-won then rose up with his brother-in-laws, Min Mu-gu and Min Mu-jil, and immediately revolted and raided the palace, killing Jeong Do-jeon, his followers, and the two sons of the late Queen Sindeok, Grand Prince Uian and Yi Bang-beon.

This incident became known as the First Strife of Princes. Aghast at the fact that his sons were willing to kill each other for the crown, and psychologically exhausted from the death of his second wife, King Taejo immediately crowned his second son Yi Bang-gwa, later King Jeongjong, as the new ruler.

In early 1400, the Second Strife of Princes happened where Yi Bang-gan, Prince Hoean, the elder brother of the prince, launched an attack on Prince Jeongan. With Prince Jeongan, Lady Min and her family fought to bring down Prince Hoean and his supporters.

On 4 March 1400, King Jeongjong pronounced his brother Yi Bang-won as heir presumptive and voluntarily abdicated. Which changed her royal title from Princess Consort Jeongnyeong to Crown Princess Consort Jeong of the Yeoheung Min clan (정빈 민씨), and was eventually given the royal title of Queen Consort Jeong of Joseon (정비, 靜妃; Jeongbi meaning Serene Consort) on 10 January 1401. Thus becoming the Queen Consort of King Taejong of Joseon, the third king of Joseon. 

Queen Jeong is described as smart and ambitious and with an astute political ambition, who frequently intervened in state affairs. She assisted her spouse in his way to the throne and convinced him to appoint their eldest son Yangnyeong as crown prince.  When he replaced their son as crown prince with his younger brother, Queen Jeong was enraged and her interference finally resulted in King Taejong executing her younger brothers in order to keep her and her family's ambition in check.

Exile and death of family 
In 1406, Taejong had brought up the topic of abdicating but withdrew his statement later on. In the process, the Queen’s eldest younger brothers Min Mu-gu and Min Mu-jil had voiced that they were very pleased with the news of Taejong’s abdication, which caused the two men to be exiled to Jeju Island, where they were later killed in 1410. In 1408, Min Je, the Queen’s father, who had a hard time coping with the exile of his sons, died that same year.

It was during these times that the Queen’s relationship with her husband was worsening due to the concubines he brought to the palace. It worsened a lot more when Queen Jeong didn’t tell Taejong about the birth of their daughter, Princess Jeongseon, in 1404. It has been said that her attitude was why the king avoided her living quarters.

8 years later, in 1416, the Queen’s remaining younger brothers, Min Mu-hyul and Min Mu-hoe, had stated that Crown Prince Je (Grand Prince Yangnyeong), her eldest son, would take great care of their family as he and their family shared a close family relationship. Word spread and reached Taejong who saw it as a threat, which once again brought the brothers to be exiled and die by suicide poisoning. But it is also said that rumors had spread that Queen Jeong had abused Taejong's concubine Royal Noble Hyo of the Cheongpung Kim and her son Prince Gyeongnyeong. In anger, Taejong exiled Min Mu-hyeol and Min Mu-hoe nearby the sea breeze and hung them to death nearby rather than dethroning Queen Jeong from her position.

Later life 
In 1418, her husband abdicated and gave the throne to their third son, Sejong of Joseon, but continued to rule with an iron fist for 3 years, deciding important matters and executing his son’s father-in-law Sim On in 1419 and two uncle-in-law’s in 1418.

Thus becoming Queen Dowager Hudeok while her husband became King Emeritus of Joseon. Her reign as Queen Dowager did not last long as it only lasted for 2 years from 9 September 1418 to her death; almost hitting the 3rd year.

Queen Dowager Hudeok, who made her husband king, but whose brothers were purged in return, died on 18 August 1420 at the age of 56 in Byeol Hall, Sugang Palace. King Taejong outlived her by two years and are buried together within Heonreung in Seoul, Seocho District.

It’s said that within the queens who were involved in Joseon Dynasty politics, Queen Wongyeong, along with Queen Munjeong, Queen Myeongseong, and Empress Myeongseong, were considered the most political, bold and broad-minded Queens.

Trivia 
The Queen is the 7th generation descendant of Min Yeong-mo; who is the founder of the Yeoheung Min clan.

Queen Wongyeong’s grandfather’s older brother, Min Yu, eventually became the 12th great-grandfather of Queen Inhyeon and the 17th great-grandfather to Empress Myeongseong. As well as her grandfather’s younger sister, her grand-aunt, was also the mother of Royal Consort Hui-bi of the Paepyeong Yun clan.

Royal Noble Consort Hyo of the Cheongpung Kim clan was originally one of Queen Jeong's servants at the Min household before she became a concubine for King Taejong, and Royal Consort Sin of the Yeongwol Sin clan was also originally one of Queen Jeong's retinue of assistant court ladies at the palace before becoming a concubine.

Family 
Parent

 Great-Great-Great-Great-Great-Great-Great-Great-Great-Grandfather
 Min Ching-do (민칭도, 閔稱道)
 Great-Great-Great-Great-Great-Great-Great-Great-Grandfather
 Min Se-hyeong (민세형, 閔世衡)
 Great-Great-Great-Great-Great-Great-Great-Grandfather
 Min Ui (민의, 閔懿)
 Great-Great-Great-Great-Great-Great-Grandfather
 Min Yeong-mo (민영모, 閔令謨) (1115 - 1194)
 Great-Great-Great-Great-Great-Great-Grandmother
 Lady Bae (배씨)
 Great-Great-Great-Great-Great-Grandfather 
 Min Gong-gyu (민공규, 閔公珪)
 Great-Great-Great-Great-Grandfather
 Min In-gyun (민인균, 閔仁鈞)
 Great-Great-Great-Grandfather
 Min Hwang (민황, 閔滉)
 Great-Great-Grandfather
 Min Jong-yu (민종유, 閔宗儒) (1245 - 27 May 1324)
 Great-Great-Grandmother
 Lady Yu (유씨, 兪氏)
 Great-Grandfather
 Min Jeok (민적, 閔頔) (1270 - 4 March 1336)
 Great-Grandmother
 Lady Won of the Wonju Won clan (원주 원씨); Min Jeok’s second wife
 Grandfather
 Min Byeon, Prince Yeoheung (여흥군 민변, 閔忭) (? - May 1377)
 Grandmother
 Lady Heo of the Yangcheon Heo clan (본관: 양천 허씨, 陽川 許氏)
 Father
 Min Je, Duke Mundo, Internal Prince Yeoheung (민제 여흥부원군 문도공, 閔霽 文度公 驪興府院君) (1339 - 1408)
 Uncle - Min Ryang (민량, 閔亮) (? - 1408)
 Aunt - Lady Min of the Yeoheung Min clan (여흥 민씨); second wife of Gwak Chu
 Uncle - Gwak Chu (곽추, 郭樞) of the Cheongju Gwak clan (1338 - 1405)
 Cousin - Gwak Woon (곽운, 郭惲)
 Cousin - Lady Gwak of the Cheongju Gwak clan (청주 곽씨)
 Cousin-in-law - Kim Yang-nam (김양남, 金揚南)
 Cousin - Lady Gwak of the Cheongju Gwak clan (청주 곽씨)
 Cousin-in-law - Kim Yuk (김육, 金育)
 Cousin - Lady Gwak of the Cheongju Gwak clan (청주 곽씨)
 Cousin-in-law - Bong Ahn-guk (봉안국, 奉安國) (1383 - ?)
 Uncle - Min Gae (민개, 閔開) (1360 - 3 December 1396)
 Mother
 Princess Consort Samhanguk of the Yeosan Song clan (삼한국대부인 여산 송씨, 三韓國大夫人 礪山 宋氏) (1342 - 1424); Min Je’s first wife
Grandfather - Song Seon (송선, 宋璿)
Grandmother - Lady Ha of the Dalseong Ha clan (달성 하씨, 達城 河氏)
 Stepmother - Lady Yi of the Yangseong Yi clan (양성 이씨, 陽城 李氏)

Sibling

2 older sisters, 4 younger brothers, and 1 younger sister:
 Older sister — Lady Min (여흥 민씨) (1355 - ?)
 Brother-in-law - Jo Pak (조박,趙璞) (1356 - 1408) of the Pyeongyang Jo clan (평양 조씨, 平壤 趙氏)
 Nephew - Jo Shin-eon (조신언, 趙愼言)
 Older sister — Princess Consort Samhanguk of the Yeoheung Min clan (삼한국대부인 여흥 민씨) (1357 - ?)
 Brother-in-law - Yi Cheon-woo, Prince Wansan (이천우 완산군, 李天祐 完山君) (1354 - 1417); King Taejong’s older half-cousin
 Nephew — Yi Gwing, Prince Yeoyang (이굉 여양군, 李宏)
 Niece-in-law - Lady Kim of the Gyeongju Kim clan (경주 김씨); Queen Jeongan’s younger sister
 Nephew - Yi Wan, Prince Yeoseong (여성군 이완)
 Nephew - Yi Seon, Prince Yeoheung (여흥군 이선)
 Younger brother — Min Mu-gu, Prince Yeogang (여강군 민무구, 閔無咎) (1369 - 17 March 1410)
 Nephew — Min Chu (민추)
 Unnamed grandnephew; son of a commoner concubine
 Younger brother — Min Mu-jil, Prince Yeoseong (여성군 민무질, 閔無疾) (1372 - 17 March 1410)
 Sister-in-law - Lady Han of the Cheongju Han clan (정경부인 청주 한씨); daughter of Han Sang-hwan (한상환)
 Nephew — Min Chok (민촉)
 Grandnephew - Min Yeon-eun (민연은)
 Grandnephew - Min Gi (민기)
 Grandnephew - Min Hong (민홍)
 Grandnephew - Min Seob (민섭)
 Nephew — Min Sam (민삼)
 Grandnephew - Min Hui-nyeom (민희념)
 Great-Grandnephew - Min Byeon (민변)
 Great-Grandnephew - Min Mu (민무)
 Great-Great-Grandnephew - Min Eung-jeong (민응정)
 Great-Great-Great-Grandnephew - Min Hyeob (민협)
 Great-Great-Great-Great-Grandnephew - Min Jung-ui (민종의)
 Nephew — Min Bun (민분)
 Grandnephew - Min Oh (민오)
 Niece — Lady Min (민씨)
 Niece — Lady Min (민씨)
 Niece — Lady Min (민씨)
 Younger brother — Min Mu-hyul, Prince Yeowon (여원군 민무휼, 閔無恤) (1373 - 13 January 1416)
 Sister-in-law - Lady Lee of the Ugye Lee clan (우계 이씨, 羽溪 李氏) 
 Niece — Lady Min (여흥 민씨) (1403 - ?)
 Nephew-in-law - Sim Jun (심준, 沈濬) (1405 - 1448); Queen Soheon’s eldest younger brother
 Grandnephew - Sim Mi (심미)
 Grandnephew - Sim Chi (심치)
 Grandniece-in-law - Lady Kim of the Suncheon Kim clan (순천 김씨)
 Niece — Lady Min (여흥 민씨)
 Younger brother: Min Mu-hoe, Prince Yeosan (여산군 민무회, 閔無悔) (1375 - 13 January 1416)
 Nephew — Min Noe (민뇌)
 Niece — Lady Min (여흥 민씨)
 Younger sister — Lady Min (여흥 민씨)
 Brother-in-law - No Han (노한, 盧閈) of the Gyoha No clan (교하 노씨, 交河 盧氏) (1376 - 1443)
 Nephew — No Mul-jae (노물재, 盧物栽) (1396 - 1446)
 Niece-in-law - Lady Sim of the Cheongsong Sim clan (1399 - ?); Queen Soheon’s second younger sister

Consort

 Yi Bang-won, King Taejong (조선 태종) (13 June 1367 - 30 May 1422)
 Father-in-law - Yi Dan, King Taejo of Joseon (조선 태조) (27 October 1335 – 18 June 1408)
 Mother-in-law - Queen Sinui of the Anbyeon Han clan (신의왕후 한씨)  (1337 - 21 October 1391)

Issue

4 daughters and 8 sons:
 Princess Jeongsun (정순공주, 貞順公主) (1385 - 1460)
 Princess Gyeongjeong (경정공주, 慶貞公主) (1387 - 20 June 1455)
 Unnamed grand prince (대군)
Unnamed grand prince (대군)
Unnamed grand prince (대군)
 Princess Gyeongan (경안공주, 慶安公主) (1393 - 22 April 1415)
 Yi Je, Grand Prince Yangnyeong (이제 양녕대군, 李禔 讓寧大君) (1394 - 7 September 1462)
 Yi Bo, Grand Prince Hyoryeong (이보 효령대군, 李補 孝寧大君) (6 January 1396 - 12 June 1486)
 Yi Do, King Sejong the Great (세종대왕) (7 May 1397 - 30 March 1450)
 Princess Jeongseon (정선공주, 貞善公主) (1404 - 25 January 1424)
 Yi Jong, Grand Prince Seongnyeong (이종 성녕대군, 李褈 誠寧大君) (3 August 1405 - 11 March 1418)
 Unnamed grand prince (대군) (1412 - 1412)

In popular culture
 Portrayed by Kim Young-ran in the 1983 MBC TV series The King of Chudong Palace.
 Portrayed by Choi Myung-gil in the 1996-1998 KBS TV series Tears of the Dragon and in the 2008 KBS TV series The Great King, Sejong.
 Portrayed by Kang Se-jung in the 2014 KBS TV series Jeon Do-jeon.
 Portrayed by Im Ye-jin in the 2015 MBC TV series Splash Splash Love.
 Portrayed by Gong Seung-yeon in the 2015-2016 SBS TV series Six Flying Dragons.
 Portrayed by Kim Sa-hee in the 2015 film Empire of Lust.
 Portrayed by Seo Young-hee in the 2021 SBS TV series Joseon Exorcist.
 Portrayed by Park Jin-hee in the 2021 KBS1 TV series Taejong Yi Bang-won.

See also 
 King Taejo
 Empress Myeongseong
 Queen Inhyeon
 King Sejong
King Jeongjong
 King Taejong
 Empress Sunmyeong
 Yeoheung Min clan
Grand Internal Princess Consort Sunmok

References

External links
 
 

1365 births
1420 deaths
14th-century Korean women
15th-century Korean women
Royal consorts of the Joseon dynasty
Korean queens consort
Yeoheung Min clan
People from Kaesong